Novy Oryebash (Yañı Uryabaş) is a rural locality (a village) in Tyuldinsky Selsoviet, Kaltasinsky District, Bashkortostan, Russia. The population was 126 as of 2010. There is 1 street.

Geography 
Novy Oryebash is located 21 km north of Kaltasy (the district's administrative centre) by road. Stary Oryebash is the nearest rural locality.

References 

Rural localities in Kaltasinsky District